Waterborne may refer to:

Waterborne disease
Waterborne (film), 2005 Indian American film
Waterborne transport